Firdausul Hasan is a film producer from Kolkata. His production house Friends Communication won best feature film in Bengali in the 65th National Awards for his film Mayurakshi. He was the former president of Film Federation of India from 2019 to 2020. Under his leadership, FFI organized first Global Cinema Festival and Bharat Bangladesh Film Awards. In 2015 he chaired the position of the president of Bengal Film and Television Chamber of Commerce till 2021. He served this position till 2021.

Biography
Hasan went to St. James' School. After finishing school, he was accepted in St. Xavier's College, Kolkata, where he completed his graduation. In his graduation days, he became involved with the students union and was elected as the General Secretary of College the Students Union. He was the honorary secretary of St. Xavier's College, Kolkata Calcutta Alumni Association from 2007 to 2009, 2011 to 2017 and 2021-.

Career
He has been working in the Bengali film industry as the producer. He founded and till now runs the film production and distribution company called Friends Communication. Apart from the film production and distribution company, he owns an event management company known as the "Flicker Book Entertainment LLB".
He has also been involved in an administrative and proprietorship capacity with two colleges in Baharampore, West Bengal, India. The colleges are called Baharampore B.Ed. college and Baharampore D.L. Ed College. He is also the franchise owner of the Dart Shooting team registered in India, called the Sharp Shooters Sporting Club.

Awards and accolades
National Award for the "Best Bengali Feature Film" at the 65th National Film Awards in 2018 for his production " Mayurakshi".
Best Asian Film Awards and also the "Best Indian Cinema Award" at the 10th Bengaluru International Film Festival. 
Mother Teresa Millennium awards (2019), XIA Business leader of the year (2018), XIA outstanding alumni (2019), and the Doshobhuja Bangali Award (2020). Bengal International Excellence Award 2021.

Filmography
 Rupkatha Noy, 2013
 Take One, 2014
 Abby Sen, 2015
 Natoker Moto, 2015
 Family Album, 2015
 Shaheb Bibi Golaam , 2016
 Meghnad Badh Rahasya, 2017
 Mayurakshi, 2017
 Mukhomukhi, 2019
 Dictionary, 2021
 Mahananda, 2022
 Aparajito, 2022
 Shesh Pata, 2023
 Padatik, 2023
 Hubba, 2023

Television (mega serial)
 Jahanara , 2018
 Agnisikha , 2021
 Saathi, 2022
 Uron Tubri, 2022
 Phaguner Mohona,2023

Theater
Rangini , 2018

References

External links
 

Living people
Bengali film producers
Bengali Hindus
Indian Hindus
Year of birth missing (living people)
Film producers from Kolkata
St. Xavier's College, Kolkata alumni